The 1973–74 Honduran Liga Nacional season was the 9th edition of the Honduran Liga Nacional.  The format of the tournament consisted of a four round-robin schedule followed by a 4-team playoff round.  C.D. España won the title after defeating C.D. Motagua in the final.  Both teams qualified to the 1975 CONCACAF Champions' Cup.

1974–75 teams

 Atlético Indio (Tegucigalpa)
 C.D. Broncos (Choluteca)
 C.D. España (San Pedro Sula)
 C.D. Federal (Tegucigalpa, promoted)
 C.D. Marathón (San Pedro Sula)
 C.D. Motagua (Tegucigalpa)
 C.D. Olimpia (Tegucigalpa)
 C.D. Platense (Puerto Cortés)
 Universidad (Tegucigalpa)
 C.D.S. Vida (La Ceiba)

Regular season

Standings

 Draws were decided by penalty kicks on the first 9 rounds, 1 point for winner and 0 points for loser.
 Draws were decided by penalty kicks from round 10 to round 36, 2 points for winner and 1 point for loser.

Final round

Cuadrangular

Cuadrangular standings

 Draws were decided by penalty kicks, 2 points for winner and 1 point for loser.

Final

Top scorer
  Rubén Rodríguez (Platense) with 15 goals

Squads

Known results

Round 1

Round 7

Round 12

Unknown rounds

Controversy
 According to the regulations of the competition, the final series (enforced for the first time this season) were supposed to be played in a home and away format.  However, after C.D. España defeated C.D. Motagua 0–1 in the first leg, they traveled back to San Pedro Sula claiming the title and went on to celebrate in front of their fan base, thus misunderstanding the newly implemented rules.  Motagua's president Pedro Atala Simón in order to avoid further conflicts, desisted in playing the second leg and granted the title which at that time represented the first championship to España and to the city of San Pedro Sula itself.

References

Liga Nacional de Fútbol Profesional de Honduras seasons
1
Honduras